Kilen may refer to the following locations:

Places
Kilen (lake), in Jutland, Denmark
Kilen, Kristiansand, a village in Kristiansand municipality in Agder county, Norway
Kilen, Kviteseid, a village in Kviteseid municipality in Vestfold og Telemark county, Norway
Kilen, Innlandet, a village in Åsnes municipality in Innlandet county, Norway
Kilen, Tvedestrand, a village in Tvedestrand municipality in Agder county, Norway
Kilen Woods State Park, a state park of Minnesota in the United States
Kilen, Greenland, a stretch of unglaciated flat land on the eastern side of the Flade Isblink